Byron Black and Grant Connell were the defending champions but did not compete that year.

Sander Groen and Goran Ivanišević won in the final 7–6, 6–3 against Sandon Stolle and Cyril Suk.

Seeds

  Ellis Ferreira /  Patrick Galbraith (semifinals)
  Libor Pimek /  Byron Talbot (first round)
  Sandon Stolle /  Cyril Suk (final)
  Andrew Kratzmann /  Pavel Vízner (first round)

Draw

References
 1997 Dubai Tennis Championships Doubles Draw

1997 Dubai Tennis Championships
Doubles